The 2015 European Junior & U23 Weightlifting Championships were held in Klaipeda, Lithuania from 3 October to 10 October 2015.

Medal overview (juniors)

Men

Women

Medals table

Medal overview (U23)

Men

Women

Medals table

Overall medals table

References

European Junior & U23 Weightlifting Championships
International sports competitions hosted by Lithuania
2015 in Lithuanian sport
2015 in weightlifting
Weightlifting competitions in Lithuania